The Malvern Fringe Festival was an arts festival (founded 1977) which took place in Great Malvern, England.  The main events of the Malvern Fringe Festival were the annual Malvern May Day and parade, and the annual three-day festival held in June as a fringe to the Elgar Festival.  These were often accompanied by musical and other live events throughout the year.

History

Malvern Fringe Festival was founded in 1977 by Adrian Mealing, a teacher in Malvern, in collaboration with Andrew Sleigh, Ian Fearnside and Phil Webb.  It originated as a reaction to the Malvern Festival which was perceived to be biased towards classical music and appealing towards a national and international audience rather than a local one. A further concern was the continued requirement for the local Council to underwrite the main festival and the feeling that the public expenditure could be more wisely spent.

The founding aims of the Fringe were to produce a popular, varied programme of events for the local people of Malvern, to bridge the gap between the "us" and "them" in the arts and to "shake it up a bit in Malvern".

The first year featured 60 events consisting of poetry, world music, folk, jazz, adult and children's theatre performed under the banner of "Associated Events" due to the main Festival's objections to the term 'Fringe', which they considered to be "outside" of the Festival. In 1978, to avoid confusion between the programmes for the two festivals, printed with similar designs at the main festival's insistence, Adrian Mealing hand wrote "Fringe" on over 3000 programmes. As the 1980s approached, the festival grew into a four-week event and the Fringe had established its own identity. Being centrally located between Hereford, Worcester, Gloucester and Cheltenham the Fringe drew a wide audiences from over a 20-mile radius.

During the 1980s, the festival attracted hundreds of visitors with a programme of 120 events over a two-week period.
 In 1982, Malvern Fringe Arts Ltd became a registered charity. By the 1990s, the Fringe programme had grown to a six-week event and was attracting comedy and cabaret acts that were beginning to establish their reputations, including Eddie Izzard, Lee Evans, Jerry Sadowitz, Jim Tavare, Chris Lynam and a double act featuring Linda Smith and Mark Thomas, plus musical acts as varied as Gong, Juicy Lucy, Voodoo Queens and Loop Guru.

 
In 2006 the Fringe re-launched its three-day festival in June, loosely based upon a theme of Elgar's interests. One of the highlights of this festival was a bicycle race (as cycling was one of Elgar's keen interests) up the steep incline of Great Malvern's Church Street. This event was supported by Commonwealth games gold medalist Liam Killeen, who's from Malvern, and was won by Tour de France cyclist, Arnaud Lenoir. The whole three-day festival was attended by over 5,000 people.

In the autumn of 2006, the Fringe launched a 'folk weekend' featuring Roy Bailey and Jez Lowe.

Malvern May Day

The Malvern May Day and Parade are an annual community event which has been held in Priory Park, Great Malvern on the Saturday before the May Bank Holiday since 1993.

Local controversy

Despite an attendance of over 5,000 people the June 2006 festival has been the subject of much negative coverage in the letters pages of the local newspaper with one correspondent calling upon readers to petition the local Member of Parliament to halt any further Fringe activities.

Notable past performers
Throughout its history Malvern Fringe featured an impressive array of performers, many of whom have gone on to become international stars.

Classical
Amsterdam Loeki Stardust Quartet
National Youth Recorder Orchestra
Edwin Roxburgh and the Hendrickse Flute Quartet

Music
3 Daft Monkeys
Daevid Allen
Roy Bailey
Bhundu Boys
Caravan
Lol Coxhill
Fred Zeppelin
Gong
Gordon Giltrap
The Groundhogs
Left, Right and Centre (featuring Nigel Kennedy and Caleb)
Juicy Lucy
Kroke
Jez Lowe
Jim MacCool
Loop Guru
Moishe's Bagel
Rory McLeod and Tymon Dogg
Moonshake
Ozric Tentacles
Hazel O'Connor
Pantagruel
Prophets of Da City
Surgeon
Suns of Arqa
June Tabor and Huw Warren
Tarika Sammy
Barbara Thompson's Paraphernalia
Voodoo Queens
The Wurzels
Zion Train

Dance
Lousie Tonkin and Lol Coxhill

Poetry
Dannie and Joan Abse
Jim MacCool
John Cooper Clarke
John Hegley
Adrian Henri
Michael Horovitz and Stan Tracey
Frances Horovitz and Pete Morgan
Joolz
Linton Kwesi Johnson
Ian McMillan
Dick McBride
Roger McGough
Henry Normal
Lemn Sissay
Gabriel Woolf

Comedy
Rowan Atkinson
Jo Brand
Jack Dee
Jenny Eclair
Lee Evans
Jeremy Hardy
Eddie Izzard
The Kipper Family
Mark Lamarr
Al Murray
Jerry Sadowitz
Linda Smith and Mark Thomas
Mark Steel
Jim Tavare

Literature
Romesh Gunesekera

Theatre
Oxford University Revue
The Theatre of Small Convenience

References

Spring festivals
Malvern, Worcestershire
Culture in Worcestershire
Fringe festivals in the United Kingdom
Charities based in Worcestershire
Festivals in Worcestershire
Music festivals established in 1977
Theatre festivals in England